Joe O'Connor (born 8 November 1995) is an English professional snooker player from Leicester. He was the 2018 English Amateur Champion and a ranking event finalist at the 2022 Scottish Open.

Career

Amateur
Previously a junior pool champion, O'Connor qualified for the snooker main draw as an amateur at the 2014 Wuxi Classic, then faced Neil Robertson at the 2014, and Mark Selby at the 2015 UK Championship. He won four events on the 2017–18 English amateur tour.

Ahead of the 2018–19 season, O'Connor defeated Brandon Sargeant 4–1 and then Oliver Brown 4–0 to secure a two-year professional tour card for the first time at the 2018 EBSA Play-Offs at the English Institute of Sport in Sheffield. In June 2018, he beat Andrew Norman 10–3 to become the English Amateur Champion before turning professional.

Professional
On 28 November 2018 O'Connor defeated world number 12 Ryan Day 6–2 in the first round at the 2018 UK Championship.

In February 2019 O'Connor defeated top 10 players Kyren Wilson, Ding Junhui and John Higgins en route to his first ranking event semi-final at the Welsh Open, eventually losing 6–2 to Stuart Bingham.

In the 2021 German Masters he made it to the quarter-finals, but he lost 5–1 to Tom Ford.

In December 2022 he reached his first ranking final at the 2022 Scottish Open, defeating Zhao Xintong, Ding Junhui, Mark Williams, Ricky Walden and Neil Robertson throughout the tournament. However, he lost 9–2 to Gary Wilson. In February 2023 he defeated number one seed Mark Allen at the Players Championship, before bowing out to Ali Carter at the semi-final stage.

Performance and rankings timeline

Career finals

Ranking finals: 1

Amateur finals: 1 (1 title)

References

External links

Joe O'Connor at worldsnooker.com

1995 births
Living people
English snooker players
21st-century English people